Muhammed Choo is a Ghanaian professional football coach and former player. He played mostly as a striker for Real Tamale United during his playing days. He won the Ghana Premier League top goal scorer on two occasions.

Playing career 
Choo played as a striker in the Ghana Premier League for Real Tamale United from 1975 to 1994, a club based in the Northern Ghana, known for producing stars like Abedi Pele and Mohammed Gargo. During the latter part of his career in the 1990s, Gargo played him. He won the Ghana Premier League top goal scorer award two times in 1978 and 1982 after scoring 22 goals and 15 goals respectively.

International career 
Choo played for the Ghana national team in the 1970s and 1980s, however injuries hampered his ability to perform at the national team level. In a match against Tunisia in February 1980, he played alongside players including Joe Carr, Papa Arko, Opoku Afriyie, Offei Ansah, Willie Klutse and Adolf Armah when Ghana scored their Tunisian counterparts 4–1.

Coaching career 
As at November 2020, he was serving as the striker's coach for his former club Real Tamale United. He is a key member of the Old players Association (PFAG) Northern Region Chapter.

Honours

Individual 
 Ghana Premier League Top scorer: 1978, 1982

References 

Living people
Year of birth missing (living people)
Association football forwards
Ghanaian footballers
People from Northern Region (Ghana)
Real Tamale United players
Ghana Premier League players
Ghana international footballers
Ghanaian Muslims
Real Tamale United non-playing staff
Ghana Premier League top scorers